The Golden Brain Award is an international science award in the field of neuroscience. It is given by the Berkeley-based Minerva Foundation every year since 1985. The foundation specifically aims at fundamental contributions to research in vision and the brain. The Golden Brain is a trophy of a gold-plated model of the human brain attached to a bronze base.

Selection

The Golden Brain Award is open to any person who has made innovative investigations and the resulting influence of those findings on the field of vision and the brain. Preference is given to studies involving higher brain function such as the aspects of behaviour, thought, attention, decision making and rational insight, and cognitive visual system. Special attributes are also considered such as a lack of deserved recognition, which is common in young scientists, and the potential for future important scientific revelations. Formal nominations are made by previous recipients, and final decision is made by the selection board.

Trophy

The Golden Brain is a model of human brain, and the name is given as it is coloured with gold. It was originally designed and crafted by Tamia Marg. The brain is a pedestal of ten inches high, held by a spinal cord-like stem which is fixed to a metal base. It is primarily made of bronze which is coated with a 23-carat gold plating at Monsen Plating in Berkeley. The flat base painted by spraying it with an acidic mixture to give it the bluish-green patina. The brain and base were fastened together, and a polished brass circle engraved with the awardee's name is mounted on the trophy. The wooden box for the trophy is made by a furniture maker, Lawrence Gandsey of Oakland. The box is of eastern maple grown (Acer saccharum)  in the Appalachians and is held together with splines of mahogany (Swietenia macrophylla) from Honduras, and is finished with a mixture of linseed oil and turpentine.

Recipients

Source: Minerva Foundation

See also

 List of neuroscience awards
 Kavli Prize
 The Brain Prize
 Gruber Prize in Neuroscience
 W. Alden Spencer Award
 Karl Spencer Lashley Award
 The Mind & Brain Prize
 Ralph W. Gerard Prize in Neuroscience

References

Neuroscience awards